These are the official results of the Men's 800 metres event at the 1990 European Championships in Split, Yugoslavia, held at Stadion Poljud on 27, 28, and 29 August 1990.

Medalists

Results

Final
29 August

Semi-finals
28 August

Semi-final 1

Semi-final 2

Heats
27 August

Heat 1

Heat 2

Heat 3

Participation
According to an unofficial count, 20 athletes from 12 countries participated in the event.

 (1)
 (1)
 (1)
 (3)
 (1)
 (1)
 (2)
 (1)
 (3)
 (1)
 (3)
 (2)

See also
 1988 Men's Olympic 800 metres (Seoul)
 1991 Men's World Championships 800 metres (Tokyo)
 1992 Men's Olympic 800 metres (Barcelona)

References

 Results

800
800 metres at the European Athletics Championships